Act of Vengeance is a 1986 television movie starring Charles Bronson, Ellen Burstyn, and Wilford Brimley.

Plot
The movie is based on the book, Act of Vengeance by Trevor Armbrister, a fact-based story about the corruption that occurred during the United Mine Workers' presidential elections in 1969. The film also portrayed the murder of Joseph "Jock" Yablonski.

Cast

Release

Home media
It premiered on April 21, 1986 on HBO under HBO Premiere Films. The film was released on VHS by HBO/Cannon Video under license from Home Box Office. But, this film was produced by Lorimar Productions and it belongs to Lorimar (subsequently later it owned by Warner Bros.) originally. However, it has never been released on DVD or Blu-ray by Warner Bros. Home Entertainment.

References

External links

1986 crime drama films
1986 television films
1986 films
American films based on actual events
United Mine Workers of America
American crime drama films
Films about mining
Films about the labor movement
Films directed by John Mackenzie (film director)
American drama television films
1980s American films